Kangkanam is a 1948 Indian Tamil language film directed by S. K. Vasagan. The film was censored in November 1947 but was released in 1948. K. R. Ramasamy, Menaka and P. G. Venkatesan featured in the lead roles.

Cast 
The following list is adapted from the database of Film News Anandan

Male cast
K. R. Ramasamy
P. G. Venkatesan
M. R. Swaminathan
Narendranath

Female cast
Menaka
Leela
P. R. Mangalam

Production 
The film was produced by G. P. Narayanan under his own banner G. P. Narayanan and Company and was directed by S. K. Vasagan. A. T. Krishnaswamy wrote the story while the dialogues were penned by Chandrasekar.

Soundtrack 
Music was composed by H. R. Padmanabha Sastry and the lyrics were penned by Kambadasan.

This was the debut film for Playback singer P. Leela.

Notes

References

External links 
 

Indian black-and-white films
1940s Tamil-language films